Alejandro Mitrano Heidenreich (born 4 April 1998) is a professional Venezuelan-Italian footballer who plays for Las Vegas Lights as a left back.

Club career

Zemplín Michalovce
Mitrano made his professional Fortuna Liga debut for Zemplín Michalovce against iClinic Sereď on 4 May 2019. He was featured directly in the starting-XI of the 2:2 tie. He also played the second half of the following fixture against Ružomberok, replacing José Carrillo. Ružomberok won 3:0.

Deportivo Petare
On 18 February 2020 it was confirmed, that Mitrano had joined Deportivo Petare. He was immediately loaned out to Uruguayan club Boston River for the 2020 season.

Las Vegas Lights
Mitrano was announced as a new signing for USL Championship side Las Vegas Lights on January 25, 2023.

References

External links
 
 
 Futbalnet profile 

1998 births
Living people
Venezuelan people of Italian descent
Venezuelan footballers
Venezuelan expatriate footballers
Association football defenders
SK Slavia Prague players
MFK Zemplín Michalovce players
Deportivo Miranda F.C. players
Boston River players
Slovak Super Liga players
Expatriate footballers in the Czech Republic
Venezuelan expatriate sportspeople in the Czech Republic
Expatriate footballers in Slovakia
Venezuelan expatriate sportspeople in Slovakia
Expatriate footballers in Uruguay
Venezuelan expatriate sportspeople in Uruguay
Las Vegas Lights FC players